Amata caspia is a species of moth of the subfamily Arctiinae first described by Otto Staudinger in 1877. It is found in south-western Russia, the southern Ural Mountains, the Caucasus, Transcaspia, Kazakhstan and Turkey.

The wingspan is 19–28 mm. Adults have been recorded on wing in June and July.

References 

caspia
Moths of Europe
Moths of Asia